The 2023 Washington Nationals season will be the Nationals' 19th season as the baseball franchise of Major League Baseball in the District of Columbia, the 16th season at Nationals Park, and the 55th since the original team was started in Montreal, Quebec, Canada.

The Nationals will attempt to improve upon their MLB-worst 55–107 record from the previous season.

Offseason 
The Nationals entered the offseason with seven pending free agents: pitchers Steve Cishek, Sean Doolittle, Will Harris, Erasmo Ramírez, Joe Ross, and Aníbal Sánchez, and infielder/outfielder César Hernández. Additionally, designated hitter Nelson Cruz became a free agent after the Nationals declined their side of a mutual option for the 2023 season, while pitcher Francisco Pérez and catcher Tres Barrera also became free agents after being outrighted to the minor leagues. The Nationals immediately signed Doolittle back on a minor league deal announced November 6, 2022, inviting him to major league spring training as well. Ramírez also signed a new deal, a one-year major league contract, to remain with the Nationals. Pérez returned to the organization on a minor league deal with an invitation to spring training. Cishek announced his retirement from professional baseball in December.

Among arbitration-eligible players, the Nationals chose not to tender new one-year contracts to pitcher Erick Fedde and designated hitter Luke Voit on November 18, 2022. They reached agreement on a new deal with infielder Ildemaro Vargas, avoiding arbitration, and tendered new contracts to seven more arbitration-eligible players: pitchers Víctor Arano, Carl Edwards Jr., Kyle Finnegan, Hunter Harvey, and Tanner Rainey and outfielders Víctor Robles and Lane Thomas. The Nationals also non-tendered pitcher Tommy Romero, who signed a minor league deal to remain with the organization, and cleared additional roster space by releasing pitcher Seth Romero, facing charges in Texas for driving under the influence, and outrighting pitchers Evan Lee and Jackson Tetreault and outfielders Yasel Antuna, Yadiel Hernández, and Josh Palacios to the minor leagues. Infielder Lucius Fox lost his roster spot in December as well, as did pitching prospect Gerardo Carrillo and journeyman reliever Reed Garrett. Another reliever, right-hander Andrés Machado, was cut loose in January after two seasons in the Nationals' bullpen.

The Nationals unveiled their first major league signings of the offseason on November 29, 2022, inking rookie outfielder Stone Garrett and veteran third baseman Jeimer Candelario to one-year deals. They added right-hander Thad Ward, a Boston Red Sox prospect, to their roster via the Rule 5 draft on December 7. Trevor Williams was signed December 10 to join the Nationals' rotation. Washington also added outfielder Corey Dickerson on a one-year deal January 10, 2023. The Nationals also claimed right-hander A. J. Alexy from the Texas Rangers and former top infield prospect Jeter Downs of the Red Sox off waivers, although Alexy was later designated for assignment and traded to the Minnesota Twins to clear a roster spot for first baseman Dominic Smith, whom the Nationals signed January 4, 2023.

Among other minor league signings, the Nationals reunited with first baseman Matt Adams, a member of their 2019 World Series championship team, in a deal announced December 14, 2022.

Media reports and rumors have linked the Nationals to other free agents during the offseason, including right-handed pitchers Seth Lugo (ultimately signed with the San Diego Padres) and Jordan Lyles (ultimately signed with the Kansas City Royals) catcher Gary Sánchez, and first baseman/outfielder Trey Mancini (ultimately signed with the Chicago Cubs).

Transactions
November 6, 2022: The Nationals signed left-handed pitcher Sean Doolittle to a minor league contract with an invitation to spring training.
November 10, 2022: The Nationals outrighted left-handed pitcher Francisco Pérez and catcher Tres Barrera to the Triple-A Rochester Red Wings.
November 14, 2022: The Nationals released left-handed pitcher Seth Romero.
November 15, 2022: The Nationals designated right-handed pitcher Tommy Romero for assignment, outrighted left-handed pitcher Evan Lee, right-handed pitcher Jackson Tetreault, and outfielder Yadiel Hernández to the Triple-A Rochester Red Wings, and selected the contracts of left-handed pitchers Matt Cronin and José A. Ferrer, right-handed pitchers Jake Irvin and Jackson Rutledge, infielder Jake Alu, and outfielder Jeremy De La Rosa.
November 18, 2022: The Nationals declined to tender new contracts to right-handed pitchers Erick Fedde and Tommy Romero and designated hitter Luke Voit.
November 29, 2022: The Nationals signed infielder Jeimer Candelario and outfielder Stone Garrett to major league contracts.
December 1, 2022: The Nationals outrighted outfielders Yasel Antuna and Josh Palacios to the minor leagues.
December 7, 2022: The Nationals selected right-handed pitcher Thad Ward from the Boston Red Sox in the Rule 5 draft.
December 10, 2022: The Nationals signed right-handed pitcher Trevor Williams to a two-year major league contract.
December 13, 2022: The Nationals claimed right-handed pitcher A. J. Alexy off waivers from the Texas Rangers and designated infielder Lucius Fox for assignment; he was outrighted to the minor leagues.
December 14, 2022: The Nationals signed right-handed pitchers Anthony Castro and Tommy Romero and infielders Matt Adams and Travis Blankenhorn to minor league contracts with invitations to spring training.
December 20, 2022: The Nationals signed right-handed pitcher Erasmo Ramírez to a one-year major league contract and designated right-handed pitcher Gerardo Carrillo for assignment; he was outrighted to the minor leagues.
December 22, 2022: The Nationals claimed infielder Jeter Downs off waivers from the Boston Red Sox and designated right-handed pitcher Reed Garrett for assignment; he elected free agency.
January 4, 2023: The Nationals signed first baseman Dominic Smith to a one-year major league contract; signed left-handed pitchers Anthony Banda and Francisco Pérez and infielder Michael Chavis to minor league contracts with invitations to spring training; and designated right-handed pitcher A. J. Alexy for assignment.
January 10, 2023: The Nationals traded right-handed pitcher A. J. Alexy to the Minnesota Twins for minor league pitcher Cristian Jiménez; signed outfielder Corey Dickerson to a one-year major league contract; and designated right-handed pitcher Andrés Machado for assignment.
January 27, 2023: The Nationals signed right-handed pitcher Alex Colomé to a minor league contract with an invitation to spring training.
January 31, 2023: The Nationals signed right-handed pitcher Wily Peralta to a minor league contract with an invitation to spring training.
February 4, 2023: The Nationals signed right-handed pitcher Chad Kuhl to a minor league contract with an invitation to spring training.
March 11, 2023: The Nationals signed catcher Keibert Ruiz to an eight-year contract extension with club options for the 2031 and 2032 seasons.

Spring training
The Nationals are holding spring training at their facility at The Ballpark of the Palm Beaches in West Palm Beach, Florida, which they share with the Houston Astros in their seventh year at the facility.

Non-roster participants in major league spring training for the Nationals included right-handed pitchers Zach Brzykcy, Gerardo Carrillo, Anthony Castro, Alex Colomé, Hobie Harris, Chad Kuhl, Andrés Machado, Wily Peralta, Tommy Romero, and Jackson Tetreault; left-handed pitchers Alberto Baldonado, Anthony Banda, Sean Doolittle, Evan Lee, and Francisco Pérez; catchers Brady Lindsly and Drew Millas; first baseman Matt Adams; infielders Michael Chavis, Lucius Fox, Erick Mejia, and Leonel Valera; and outfielders Yasel Antuna, Travis Blankenhorn, Donovan Casey, Yadiel Hernández, and Derek Hill.

Veteran right-hander Stephen Strasburg did not report to spring training in West Palm Beach after suffering a setback in his quest to return from thoracic outlet syndrome. Players present in camp but not as full participants included right-handed reliever Tanner Rainey, working his way back from Tommy John surgery the previous season; right-hander Jackson Tetreault, who had a season-ending shoulder fracture in 2022; left-handed reliever Sean Doolittle, who had an elbow brace procedure the previous season; and third baseman Carter Kieboom, who also had Tommy John surgery in 2022. Additionally, non-roster outfielder Derek Hill suffered a hamstring strain while running to first base during a game, and catcher Israel Pineda suffered a displaced pinky finger when he was struck by a pitch, while Kieboom experienced shoulder discomfort following a game, forcing them to slow down their ramp-up for the season.

During spring training, the Nationals unveiled a contract extension with 24-year-old catcher Keibert Ruiz, keeping him under team control through the 2032 season.

Regular season

Season standings

National League East

National League Wild Card

Game log

|- style="background: 
| 1 || March 30 || Braves || – || || || — || || – ||
|- style="background: 
| 2 || April 1 || Braves || – || || || — || || – ||
|- style="background: 
| 3 || April 2 || Braves || – || || || — || || – ||
|- style="background: 
| 4 || April 3 || Rays || – || || || — || || – ||
|- style="background: 
| 5 || April 4 || Rays || – || || || — || || – ||
|- style="background: 
| 6 || April 5 || Rays || – || || || — || || – ||
|- style="background: 
| 7 || April 6 || @ Rockies || – || || || — || || – ||
|- style="background: 
| 8 || April 7 || @ Rockies || – || || || — || || – ||
|- style="background: 
| 9 || April 8 || @ Rockies || – || || || — || || – ||
|- style="background: 
| 10 || April 9 || @ Rockies || – || || || — || || – ||
|- style="background: 
| 11 || April 10 || @ Angels || – || || || — || || – ||
|- style="background: 
| 12 || April 11 || @ Angels || – || || || — || || – ||
|- style="background: 
| 13 || April 12 || @ Angels || – || || || — || || – ||
|- style="background: 
| 14 || April 14 || Guardians || – || || || — || || – ||
|- style="background: 
| 15 || April 15 || Guardians || – || || || — || || – ||
|- style="background: 
| 16 || April 16 || Guardians || – || || || — || || – ||
|- style="background: 
| 17 || April 18 || Orioles || – || || || — || || – ||
|- style="background: 
| 18 || April 19 || Orioles || – || || || — || || – ||
|- style="background: 
| 19 || April 21 || @ Twins || – || || || — || || – ||
|- style="background: 
| 20 || April 22 || @ Twins || – || || || — || || – ||
|- style="background: 
| 21 || April 23 || @ Twins || – || || || — || || – ||
|- style="background: 
| 22 || April 25 || @ Mets || – || || || — || || – ||
|- style="background: 
| 23 || April 26 || @ Mets || – || || || — || || – ||
|- style="background: 
| 24 || April 27 || @ Mets || – || || || — || || – ||
|- style="background: 
| 25 || April 28 || Pirates || – || || || — || || – ||
|- style="background: 
| 26 || April 29 || Pirates || – || || || — || || – ||
|- style="background: 
| 27 || April 30 || Pirates || – || || || — || || – ||
|- 
 

|- style="background: 
| 28 || May 1 || Cubs || – || || || — || || – ||
|- style="background: 
| 29 || May 2 || Cubs || – || || || — || || – ||
|- style="background: 
| 30 || May 3 || Cubs || – || || || — || || – ||
|- style="background: 
| 31 || May 4 || Cubs || – || || || — || || – ||
|- style="background: 
| 32 || May 5 || @ Diamondbacks || – || || || — || || – ||
|- style="background: 
| 33 || May 6 || @ Diamondbacks || – || || || — || || – ||
|- style="background: 
| 34 || May 7 || @ Diamondbacks || – || || || — || || – ||
|- style="background: 
| 35 || May 8 || @ Giants || – || || || — || || – ||
|- style="background: 
| 36 || May 9 || @ Giants || – || || || — || || – ||
|- style="background: 
| 37 || May 10 || @ Giants || – || || || — || || – ||
|- style="background: 
| 38 || May 12 || Mets || – || || || — || || – ||
|- style="background: 
| 39 || May 13 || Mets || – || || || — || || – ||
|- style="background: 
| 40 || May 14 || Mets || – || || || — || || – ||
|- style="background: 
| 41 || May 15 || Mets || – || || || — || || – ||
|- style="background: 
| 42 || May 16 || @ Marlins || – || || || — || || – ||
|- style="background: 
| 43 || May 17 || @ Marlins || – || || || — || || – ||
|- style="background: 
| 44 || May 18 || @ Marlins || – || || || — || || – ||
|- style="background: 
| 45 || May 19 || Tigers || – || || || — || || – ||
|- style="background: 
| 46 || May 20 || Tigers || – || || || — || || – ||
|- style="background: 
| 47 || May 21 || Tigers || – || || || — || || – ||
|- style="background: 
| 48 || May 23 || Padres || – || || || — || || – ||
|- style="background: 
| 49 || May 24 || Padres || – || || || — || || – ||
|- style="background: 
| 50 || May 25 || Padres || – || || || — || || – ||
|- style="background: 
| 51 || May 26 || @ Royals || – || || || — || || – ||
|- style="background: 
| 52 || May 27 || @ Royals || – || || || — || || – ||
|- style="background: 
| 53 || May 28 || @ Royals || – || || || — || || – ||
|- style="background: 
| 54 || May 29 || @ Dodgers || – || || || — || || – ||
|- style="background: 
| 55 || May 30 || @ Dodgers || – || || || — || || – ||
|- style="background: 
| 56 || May 31 || @ Dodgers || – || || || — || || – ||
|- 
 

|- style="background: 
| 57 || June 2 || Phillies || – || || || — || || – ||
|- style="background: 
| 58 || June 3 || Phillies || – || || || — || || – ||
|- style="background: 
| 59 || June 4 || Phillies || – || || || — || || – ||
|- style="background: 
| 60 || June 6 || Diamondbacks || – || || || — || || – ||
|- style="background: 
| 61 || June 7 || Diamondbacks || – || || || — || || – ||
|- style="background: 
| 62 || June 8 || Diamondbacks || – || || || — || || – ||
|- style="background: 
| 63 || June 9 || @ Braves || – || || || — || || – ||
|- style="background: 
| 64 || June 10 || @ Braves || – || || || — || || – ||
|- style="background: 
| 65 || June 11 || @ Braves || – || || || — || || – ||
|- style="background: 
| 66 || June 13 || @ Astros || – || || || — || || – ||
|- style="background: 
| 67 || June 14 || @ Astros || – || || || — || || – ||
|- style="background: 
| 68 || June 15 || @ Astros || – || || || — || || – ||
|- style="background: 
| 69 || June 16 || Marlins || – || || || — || || – ||
|- style="background: 
| 70 || June 17 || Marlins || – || || || — || || – ||
|- style="background: 
| 71 || June 18 || Marlins || – || || || — || || – ||
|- style="background: 
| 72 || June 19 || Cardinals || – || || || — || || – ||
|- style="background: 
| 73 || June 20 || Cardinals || – || || || — || || – ||
|- style="background: 
| 74 || June 21 || Cardinals || – || || || — || || – ||
|- style="background: 
| 75 || June 23 || @ Padres || – || || || — || || – ||
|- style="background: 
| 76 || June 24 || @ Padres || – || || || — || || – ||
|- style="background: 
| 77 || June 25 || @ Padres || – || || || — || || – ||
|- style="background: 
| 78 || June 26 || @ Mariners || – || || || — || || – ||
|- style="background: 
| 79 || June 27 || @ Mariners || – || || || — || || – ||
|- style="background: 
| 80 || June 28 || @ Mariners || – || || || — || || – ||
|- style="background: 
| 81 || June 30 || @ Phillies || – || || || — || || – ||
|- 
 

|- style="background: 
| 82 || July 1 || @ Phillies || – || || || — || || – ||
|- style="background: 
| 83 || July 2 || @ Phillies || – || || || — || || – ||
|- style="background: 
| 84 || July 3 || Reds || – || || || — || || – ||
|- style="background: 
| 85 || July 4 || Reds || – || || || — || || – ||
|- style="background: 
| 86 || July 5 || Reds || – || || || — || || – ||
|- style="background: 
| 87 || July 6 || Reds || – || || || — || || – ||
|- style="background: 
| 88 || July 7 || Rangers || – || || || — || || – ||
|- style="background: 
| 89 || July 8 || Rangers || – || || || — || || – ||
|- style="background: 
| 90 || July 9 || Rangers || – || || || — || || – ||
|- style="text-align:center; background:#bbb;"
|colspan=10| All–Star Break (July 10–13)
|- style="background: 
| 91 || July 14 || @ Cardinals || – || || || — || || – ||
|- style="background: 
| 92 || July 15 || @ Cardinals || – || || || — || || – ||
|- style="background: 
| 93 || July 16 || @ Cardinals || – || || || — || || – ||
|- style="background: 
| 94 || July 17 || @ Cubs || – || || || — || || – ||
|- style="background: 
| 95 || July 18 || @ Cubs || – || || || — || || – ||
|- style="background: 
| 96 || July 19 || @ Cubs || – || || || — || || – ||
|- style="background: 
| 97 || July 21 || Giants || – || || || — || || – ||
|- style="background: 
| 98 || July 22 || Giants || – || || || — || || – ||
|- style="background: 
| 99 || July 23 || Giants || – || || || — || || – ||
|- style="background: 
| 100 || July 24 || Rockies || – || || || — || || – ||
|- style="background: 
| 101 || July 25 || Rockies || – || || || — || || – ||
|- style="background: 
| 102 || July 26 || Rockies || – || || || — || || – ||
|- style="background: 
| 103 || July 27 || @ Mets || – || || || — || || – ||
|- style="background: 
| 104 || July 28 || @ Mets || – || || || — || || – ||
|- style="background: 
| 105 || July 29 || @ Mets || – || || || — || || – ||
|- style="background: 
| 106 || July 30 || @ Mets || – || || || — || || – ||
|- style="background: 
| 107 || July 31 || Brewers || – || || || — || || – ||
|- 
 

|- style="background: 
| 108 || August 1 || Brewers || – || || || — || || – ||
|- style="background: 
| 109 || August 2 || Brewers || – || || || — || || – ||
|- style="background: 
| 110 || August 4 || @ Reds || – || || || — || || – ||
|- style="background: 
| 111 || August 5 || @ Reds || – || || || — || || – ||
|- style="background: 
| 112 || August 6 || @ Reds || – || || || — || || – ||
|- style="background: 
| 113 || August 7 || @ Phillies || – || || || — || || – ||
|- style="background: 
| 114 || August 8 || @ Phillies || – || || || — || || – ||
|- style="background: 
| 115 || August 9 || @ Phillies || – || || || — || || – ||
|- style="background: 
| 116 || August 10 || @ Phillies || – || || || — || || – ||
|- style="background: 
| 117 || August 11 || Athletics || – || || || — || || – ||
|- style="background: 
| 118 || August 12 || Athletics || – || || || — || || – ||
|- style="background: 
| 119 || August 13 || Athletics || – || || || — || || – ||
|- style="background: 
| 120 || August 15 || Red Sox || – || || || — || || – ||
|- style="background: 
| 121 || August 16 || Red Sox || – || || || — || || – ||
|- style="background: 
| 122 || August 17 || Red Sox || – || || || — || || – ||
|- style="background: 
| 123 || August 18 || Phillies || – || || || — || || – ||
|- style="background: 
| 124 || August 19 || Phillies || – || || || — || || – ||
|- style="background: 
| 125 || August 20 || Phillies || – || || || — || || – ||
|- style="background: 
| 126 || August 22 || @ Yankees || – || || || — || || – ||
|- style="background: 
| 127 || August 23 || @ Yankees || – || || || — || || – ||
|- style="background: 
| 128 || August 24 || @ Yankees || – || || || — || || – ||
|- style="background: 
| 129 || August 25 || @ Marlins || – || || || — || || – ||
|- style="background: 
| 130 || August 26 || @ Marlins || – || || || — || || – ||
|- style="background: 
| 131 || August 27 || @ Marlins || – || || || — || || – ||
|- style="background: 
| 132 || August 28 || @ Blue Jays || – || || || — || || – ||
|- style="background: 
| 133 || August 29 || @ Blue Jays || – || || || — || || – ||
|- style="background: 
| 134 || August 30 || @ Blue Jays || – || || || — || || – ||
|- style="background: 
| 135 || August 31 || Marlins || – || || || — || || – ||
|- 
 

|- style="background: 
| 136 || September 1 || Marlins || – || || || — || || – ||
|- style="background: 
| 137 || September 2 || Marlins || – || || || — || || – ||
|- style="background: 
| 138 || September 3 || Marlins || – || || || — || || – ||
|- style="background: 
| 139 || September 5 || Mets || – || || || — || || – ||
|- style="background: 
| 140 || September 6 || Mets || – || || || — || || – ||
|- style="background: 
| 141 || September 8 || Dodgers || – || || || — || || – ||
|- style="background: 
| 142 || September 9 || Dodgers || – || || || — || || – ||
|- style="background: 
| 143 || September 10 || Dodgers || – || || || — || || – ||
|- style="background: 
| 144 || September 11 || @ Pirates || – || || || — || || – ||
|- style="background: 
| 145 || September 12 || @ Pirates || – || || || — || || – ||
|- style="background: 
| 146 || September 13 || @ Pirates || – || || || — || || – ||
|- style="background: 
| 147 || September 14 || @ Pirates || – || || || — || || – ||
|- style="background: 
| 148 || September 15 || @ Brewers || – || || || — || || – ||
|- style="background: 
| 149 || September 16 || @ Brewers || – || || || — || || – ||
|- style="background: 
| 150 || September 17 || @ Brewers || – || || || — || || – ||
|- style="background: 
| 151 || September 18 || White Sox || – || || || — || || – ||
|- style="background: 
| 152 || September 19 || White Sox || – || || || — || || – ||
|- style="background: 
| 153 || September 20 || White Sox || – || || || — || || – ||
|- style="background: 
| 154 || September 21 || Braves || – || || || — || || – ||
|- style="background: 
| 155 || September 22 || Braves || – || || || — || || – ||
|- style="background: 
| 156 || September 23 || Braves || – || || || — || || – ||
|- style="background: 
| 157 || September 24 || Braves || – || || || — || || – ||
|- style="background: 
| 158 || September 26 || @ Orioles || – || || || — || || – ||
|- style="background: 
| 159 || September 27 || @ Orioles || – || || || — || || – ||
|- style="background: 
| 160 || September 29 || @ Braves || – || || || — || || – ||
|- style="background: 
| 161 || September 30 || @ Braves || – || || || — || || – ||
|- style="background: 
| 162 || October 1 || @ Braves || – || || || — || || – ||
|-

Current roster

Farm system

References

External links
2023 Washington Nationals season at Baseball Reference

Washington Nationals seasons
Washington Nationals
Washington Nationals